Batasan Hills is a barangay of Quezon City, Philippines. The barangay was originally planned as the National Government Center of the Philippines. The Batasang Pambansa Complex, which sits atop the Constitution Hill, is the legislative session hall of the House of Representatives of the Philippines. The Sandiganbayan, a special appellate court, is also located here.

The barangay borders the barangays of Commonwealth and Bagong Silangan to the north, Barangay Holy Spirit to the west, Barangay Matandang Balara to the south, and the municipality of San Mateo, Rizal to the east.

Background 

Barangay Batasan Hills is a portion of Barangay Matandang Balara separated and constituted into a new barangay through the initiative of Ben Morales/President- Filinvest 1 Homeowners association, Melvin Morallos/Chairman-Tanggol Karapatan Dist.II/August Twenty One Movement and Manolo Taroy/Congressional Staff of Congressman Alberto of Catanduanes who sponsored the bill for the creation of Barangay Batasan Hills, and by virtue of Batas Pambansa Blg. 343 - An Act Creating Barangay Batasan Hills in Quezon City, Metropolitan Manila on February 25, 1983. Section 2 of the act specified the area of the new barangay:

A plebiscite was conducted and ratified by the majority of the votes casts by the residents. In 1986, after the People Power Revolution and 3 years after the approval of Batas Pambansa Blg. 343, the first set of barangay officials were appointed by President Corazon C. Aquino through the (then) Secretary of Interior and Local Government Aquilino Pimentel. Manuel D. Laxina was the first appointed Barangay Chairman, along with 6 Barangay Kagawads (Barangay Counselors).

The barangay was envisioned to be the new home of the National Government Center, an area housing the three branches of the Philippine government (legislative, executive and judicial), because Quezon City was declared the capital of the country in 1948. This government center in Quezon City was originally planned to be at what is now Quezon Memorial Circle, before it was moved north to the area of what is now Batasan Hills. Even as the Batasang Pambansa Complex was being completed, the capital of the country was transferred to Manila in 1976. Before its creation as a barangay, the area was called "Constitution Hill", referring to the hilly area on where the government center was supposed to rise.

Today, most of Batasan Hills is residential. Although it has one of the largest urban poor populations in the country, it is also home to middle and upper class real estate properties like Filinvest 1 and 2, Northview 1 and 2, and Treviso which were developed by real estate firm Filinvest Land. Other middle and upper class real estate properties include Vista Real Executive Village and Vista Real Classica Subdivision.

Government 
The barangay is in the Legislative districts of Quezon City. The current barangay captain is John "Jojo" M. Abad.  It is home to several important National Government institutions including the House of Representatives of the Philippines at the Batasang Pambansa Complex, the Sandiganbayan, and the Commission on Audit.

Buildings and structures 
Notable buildings and structures within the barangay include the Batasang Pambansa Complex which houses the House of Representatives, and the Sandiganbayan Centennial Building, home of the Sandiganbayan which is one of the appellate courts of the Philippine judiciary. Other government agencies in the area include the headquarters of the Civil Service Commission, the Commission on Audit, and the Department of Social Welfare and Development.

Also located within the barangay is Ever Gotesco Commonwealth (a shopping mall), a Convergys office (call center), a branch of Starbucks, Ministop, and St. Peter's Parish along Commonwealth Avenue.

Residential Subdivisions/Villages 

The barangay is mostly residential with a number of subdivisions and villages which include:
Sugartowne Subdivision
Filinvest 1 Subdivision
Filinvest 2 Subdivision
Filinvest Heights
Luzviminda Village
Ciudad Regina
Doña Pilar Subdivision
Northview 1 Subdivision
Northview 2 Subdivision
Sugartowne Housing Project
Serra Monte Villas
Treviso
Spring Country Subdivision
Capitol Ridge Executive Subdivision
New Capitol Estates 1
New Capitol Estates 2
Sunnyside Heights Subdivision
Nelson Ville I
Villa Amor Uno
Vista Real Executive Village
Vista Real Classica Subdivision
Violago Homes
Woodcrest Homes
Garland Subdivision
Señorita Subdivision

Schools 
There are schools located in the barangay namely:
Imelda Operio's Learning School
Advanced Seminary Of Leadership (JCITA-ASOL)
Foothills Christian School
Anima Christi Academy
Young Scholars Academy
Caroline Learning Center [Preparatory to High School]
Batasan Hills National High School
Benz-On School
Pres. Corazon C. Aquino Elementary School (Formerly Batasan Hills Elementary School)
San Diego Elementary School
Diliman Preparatory School
Capitol Hills Christian School
Our Lady of Mercy School
Our Lord Saviour Academy
Mary the Queen College
Mary the Queen Academy English-Chinese School
Quezon City Polytechnic University-Batasan Campus
Sto. Niño Institute of Science and Technology - Talanay Branch
Fairhope Academy
Paul Christian Academy [Elementary School]
Kumdang Jungang Christian School Inc. (Formerly known as Batasan Chunan/BCCSI)
Royal Kids Academy of Arts

Churches 
St. Peter's Parish
San Antonio De Padua Parish
Members Church of God International (Ang Dating Daan)
Capitol Hills Christian Church
Christ to the Philippines-Batasan Hills Chapter (CTTP) 
Christ the King Parish
Christ Life Prayer Ministry International
Protestant Parishes
The Church of Jesus Christ of Latter-day Saints (LDS church)
Batasan Hills International Baptist Church
Jesus Christ Is The Answer Church International
Jesus Christ Saves Global Outreach - Batasan Family
Pentecostal Missionary Church of Christ
Manila Oh Jung Church
Bastion Of Truth Reformed Church
The Living God (Full Gospel Christian Church)
Good News Family Worship Center
Park Baptist Church and Missions
Presentation of our Lord Parish (located in Filinvest 1)
Iglesia Ni Cristo Locale Congregation of Batasan Hills
ACTS-Evangelism Assemblies of the Lord Jesus Christ Phils. Inc. (Apostolic Church)

Sub-Parishes 
Mary the Queen Sub-Parish
Santo Nino Sub-Parish (Villa Amor Uno subdivision)
Our Lady of Assumption
Banal na Puso
Our Lady of Fatima

Sports Organization 
Unified Darters of Batasan Hills
A group of darters in luzviminda village particularly at Digos St.
this non-profit organization to encourage especially the youth of the 
new generation to have an interest to play and be one of the top players
not only in Batasan but as national dart player as well.

This group is organizing street darts tournament, during weekends.

Transportation 

There are three major roads in Batasan Hills: Commonwealth Avenue (Radial Road 7/N170), Batasan (IBP) Road and the Batasan-San Mateo Road. In the future, Batasan will be served by the Batasan Station of MRT Line 7 located a few meters south of the junction of Commonwealth Avenue and IBP Road near the Sandiganbayan Centennial Building.

Tricycles are a popular form of transportation that ply the neighborhoods of Batasan Hills. The Batasan Tricycle Terminal is located near the Sandiganbayan. It is a popular pick-up/drop-off site for passengers of PUV and UV Express. Tricycle routes serves Filinvest, Talanay, Sitio Taniman and also nearby barangays such as Bagong Silangan and Payatas.

Incidents 
Batasang Pambansa bombing. On November 13, 2007, an explosion occurred on South Wing of the Batasan Complex killing four people including Congressman Wahab Akbar of Basilan and injuring six more including Representatives Luzviminda Ilagan of GABRIELA and Pryde Henry Teves of Negros Oriental.

References

External links 

 Barangay Batasan Hills – official website

Quezon City
Barangays of Quezon City
Barangays of Metro Manila